Kemokai Kallon nickname Panbody (born March 17, 1972 in Kenema, Sierra Leone) is a Sierra Leonean footballer who is currently playing as a defender for Kallon F.C., where he is the captain of the team. He is the older-brother of Sierra Leonean international footballer Mohamed Kallon and the younger brother of former Sierra Leonean international footballer Musa Kallon.

At club level, he made an appearance for Ljungskile SK in Sweden in 1997, and in the same year went on to play for Norrby IF, where he obtained 4 appearances and managed 1 goal. At international level, he was also a member of the Sierra Leone national football team at the 1994 African Nations Cup in Tunisia and the 1996 African Nations Cup in South Africa. He announced his retirement from international football in 2006 at age 34.

External links
 

1972 births
Living people
Sierra Leone international footballers
1994 African Cup of Nations players
1996 African Cup of Nations players
Expatriate footballers in Lebanon
Sierra Leonean footballers
Sierra Leonean expatriate footballers
Expatriate footballers in Guinea
Expatriate footballers in Sweden
Allsvenskan players
Ljungskile SK players
AS Kaloum Star players
Safa SC players
Tadamon Sour SC players
People from Kenema

Association football central defenders
Sierra Leonean expatriate sportspeople in Lebanon
Lebanese Premier League players